Acoleidae is a family of flatworms belonging to the order Cyclophyllidea.

Genera:
 Acoleus Fuhrmann, 1899
 Diplophallus Fuhrmann, 1900
 Himantocestus Ukoli, 1965

References

Platyhelminthes